The Minister for Regional Health is a minister in the New South Wales Government with responsibility for hospitals and health services in regional New South Wales, Australia.

In the second Perrottet ministry since December 2021 it is one of four portfolios in the health sector working with the Minister for Health, Brad Hazzard. The current minister Bronnie Taylor also holds the portfolio of mental health. The fourth portfolio, regional youth is currently held by Ben Franklin. Together they administer the health portfolio through the Health cluster, including the Ministry of Health and a range of other government agencies, including local health districts and the NSW Ambulance service. 

Taylor has stated that her role was created to fix issues in NSW regional hospitals that had been identified by a parliamentary inquiry.

In the second Perrottet ministry there are four other ministers with specific regional responsibility:

 Minister for Regional New South Wales, Paul Toole
 Minister for Regional Youth, Ben Franklin
 Minister for Regional Transport and Roads, Sam Farraway
 Minister for Western New South Wales, Dugald Saunders.

List of ministers
The following individuals have served as Minister for regional health, or any precedent titles:

References

Regional Health